Almerían silks were a class of luxury textiles manufactured in Almería. During the Almoravid age there were 800 workshops in the Islamic town devoted to the manufacture of silks goods. These included luxury fabrics and brocades called dihaj and siqlatun respectively, silk threads, curtains and netting, striped silks called attabi, knotted silks called muajar, silks of Isfahani style and more. At the height of Almoravid prosperity in the 12th century imitations of Baghdadi silks were especially prized of which the shroud of San Pedro de Osma is a notable example.

Almería was, along with Cordoba, Malaga and Seville, one of the centers of silk weaving crafts mentioned most frequently by the writers Ibn Hawkal, Yakut and Makkari.

See also
Armazine
Barragan (cloth)

References

External links
A woven brocade fragment from Almeriá, Spain, early 12th century

Woven fabrics
Silk
Almería
Almoravid dynasty